Cayaponia is the largest genus in the gourd family, Cucurbitaceae, with about 60 species. The plants are referred to as melonleaf. They are common from the southern United States to South America. Some species are also found in western Africa, Madagascar, and Fernando de Noronha, which is about 354 km off the coast of Brazil. It is native the southern United States to central South America and the Caribbean islands. Most species are found in rainforests and have white or yellow-green flowers. The original Cayaponia were pollinated by bats, but at least two shifts to bee pollination have occurred among some of its species. This is apparently the first clade to shift from bat to bee pollination vice bee to bat pollination. A 2011 study based on genetics placed the genus Selysia under this genus.

Brazilian botanist António Luiz Patricio da Silva Manso named this genus after the indigenous Cayapo people of Brazil.

Species 
There are around 120 species in the genus:

Cayaponia africana (Hook. f.) Exell
Cayaponia alarici M. Porto
Cayaponia alata Cogn.
Cayaponia almeideana Sald. & Cogn.
Cayaponia amazonica (Poepp. & Endl.) Cogn.
Cayaponia americana (Lam.) Cogn.
Cayaponia andreana Cogn.
Cayaponia angustiloba (Cogn.) Cogn.
Cayaponia attenuata (Hook. & Arn.) Cogn.
Cayaponia aubia  	Rose	
Cayaponia austin-smithii  	Standl.
Cayaponia bidentata  	(Hampshire) P. Duchen & S.S. Renner
Cayaponia biflora Cogn. ex Harms	
Cayaponia boliviensis  	Cogn.	
Cayaponia bonariensis  	(Mill.) Mart.
Cayaponia bonplandii (Cogn.) Cogn.
Cayaponia botryocarpa C. Jeffrey
Cayaponia boykinii (Torr. & A. Gray) Cogn.	
Cayaponia buraeavii  	Cogn.
Cayaponia cabocla  	Mart.	
Cayaponia calycina  	Cogn.
Cayaponia capitata  	Cogn. ex Harms	
Cayaponia caulobotrys  	C. Jeffrey	
Cayaponia citrullifolia  	(Griseb.) Cogn.	
Cayaponia coccinea  	André ex Cogn.
Cayaponia cogniauxiana  	Gomes-Klein	
Cayaponia cordata  	(Cogn.) P. Duchen & S.S. Renner	
Cayaponia cordifolia  	Cogn.
Cayaponia coriacea  	Cogn.
Cayaponia cruegeri  	(Naudin) Cogn.
Cayaponia denticulata  	Killip ex C. Jeffrey
Cayaponia diffusa  	Silva Manso	
Cayaponia diversifolia  	Cogn.	
Cayaponia domingensis  	(Cogn.) H. Schaef. & M. Nee	
Cayaponia dubia  	Rose	
Cayaponia duckei  	Harms	
Cayaponia elliptica  	Silva Manso	
Cayaponia eriantha  	 	 	 
Cayaponia espelina  	(Silva Manso) Cogn.	
Cayaponia excisa  	(Griseb.) Cogn.	
Cayaponia ferruginea  	Gomes-Klein	
Cayaponia ficifolia  	(Lam.) Cogn.
Cayaponia flaminensis  	Cogn.	 	 
Cayaponia floribunda  	Cogn.	
Cayaponia fluminensis  	Cogn.	
Cayaponia glandulosa  	(Poepp. & Endl.) Cogn.	
Cayaponia glazivoii  	Cogn.	 	 
Cayaponia globosa  	Silva Manso	
Cayaponia gracillima  	Cogn.	
Cayaponia granatensis Cogn.
Cayaponia grandiflora  	Cogn.	
Cayaponia grandifolia  	(Torr. & A. Gray) 
Cayaponia guianensis  	C. Jeffrey	
Cayaponia hammelii  	Grayum	
Cayaponia heterophylla  	(Naudin) Cogn.
Cayaponia hirsuta  	Cogn.	
Cayaponia jenmanii  	C. Jeffrey	
Cayaponia kathematophora  	R.E. Schult.	
Cayaponia laciniosa  	(L.) C. Jeffrey	
Cayaponia latebrosa  	(Aiton) Cogn.	
Cayaponia latifolia  	Cogn.	
Cayaponia laxa  	Cogn. ex Harms	
Cayaponia leucosticta  	Standl.	
Cayaponia lhotskyana  	Cogn.	 	 
Cayaponia longifolia  	Cogn.	
Cayaponia longiloba  	A.K. Monro	
Cayaponia macrantha  	Pittier	
Cayaponia macrocalyx  	Harms	
Cayaponia martiana  	Cogn.	
Cayaponia maximowiczii  	Cogn.	
Cayaponia membranacea  	Gomes-Klein	
Cayaponia metensis  	Cuatrec.	
Cayaponia micrantha  	Cogn.	
Cayaponia microdonta  	S.F. Blake	
Cayaponia multiglandulosa  	R. Fern.	
Cayaponia nitida  	Gomes-Klein & Pirani	
Cayaponia noronhae  	C. Jeffrey	
Cayaponia oerstedii  	Cogn.	 	 
Cayaponia ophthalmica  	R.E. Schult.	
Cayaponia oppositifolia  	Harms	
Cayaponia ottoniana  	Cogn.	
Cayaponia ovata  	Cogn.	
Cayaponia palmata  	Cogn.	
Cayaponia paraensis  	Harms	
Cayaponia pedata  	Cogn.	
Cayaponia pentaphylla  	Cogn.	
Cayaponia peruviana  	(Poepp. & Endl.) Cogn.	
Cayaponia petiolulata  	Cogn.	
Cayaponia piauhiensis  	(Cogn.) Cogn.	
Cayaponia pilosa  	Cogn.
Cayaponia podantha  	Cogn.
Cayaponia poeppigii  	Cogn.
Cayaponia prunifera  	(Poepp. & Endl.) P. Duchen & S.S. Renner
Cayaponia psederifolia  	Standl. ex J.F. Macbr.	
Cayaponia quinqueloba  	(Raf.) Shinners	
Cayaponia racemosa  	(Mill.) Cogn.
Cayaponia reticulata  	Cogn.	
Cayaponia rigida  	(Cogn.) Cogn.	
Cayaponia rugosa  	Gomes-Klein & Pirani	
Cayaponia ruizii  	Cogn.	
Cayaponia saldanhaei  	Cogn.	
Cayaponia sandia  	Cogn. ex Griseb.	
Cayaponia schenckii  	Cogn.	
Cayaponia selysioides  	C. Jeffrey	
Cayaponia sessiliflora  	Wunderlin	
Cayaponia setulosa  	Cogn.	
Cayaponia simplicifolia 	(Naudin) Cogn.	
Cayaponia smithii  	Standl.	
Cayaponia subsessilis  	(Cogn.) Sandw. & Cheesm.	
Cayaponia tayuya  	(Vell.) Cogn.	
Cayaponia ternata  	Cogn.	
Cayaponia tessmannii  	Harms	
Cayaponia tibiricae 	Cogn.	
Cayaponia tomentosa  	Cogn.	
Cayaponia triangularis  	(Cogn.) Cogn.	
Cayaponia trichocalyx  	Killip & Cuatrec.	
Cayaponia trifoliata  	Cogn.	 	 
Cayaponia trifoliolata  	Cogn.	
Cayaponia trilobata  	Cogn.	
Cayaponia tubulosa  	Cogn.	
Cayaponia ulei  	Cogn. ex Harms	
Cayaponia villosissima  	Cogn.	
Cayaponia weddellii (Naudin) Cogn.

References

Cucurbitaceae genera
Cucurbitoideae